The New Palestine magazine was founded in December 1919, initially as a weekly and later as a bi-weekly, published in New York. It was the official organ of the Zionist Organization of America (ZOA). 
 
It started as a four-page publication. The first issue in January 1920 read: "For the Restoration and up-building of a Jewish Palestine." Its managing editor was Isidore Cooperman. 
 
It evolved from The Maccabean Magazine by Louis Lipsky and Meyer Wolf Weisgal.

Contributors included Menachem Ribalow (1895–1953), who published numerous articles in New Palestine, and the philanthropist and businessman Jacob Henry Schiff (born Jakob Heinrich Schiff; January 10, 1847 – September 25, 1920).

In 1934, Samuel Caplan was editor.

Ludwig Lewisohn (May 30, 1882 – December 31, 1955) novelist, literary critic, the drama critic for The Nation and then its associate editor, was its editor and editorial-writer between 1943 and 1948.

References 

Jews and Judaism in New York (state)
Magazines published in New York (state)
Magazines established in 1919
Political magazines published in the United States
Zionism in the United States